Aibek Bokoyev (4 January 1982) is a retired Kyrgyzstani footballer, who was a striker. He played for numerous clubs in his native country, including Abdish-Ata Kant and Dordoi-Dynamo Naryn. He was a member and a captain of the Kyrgyzstan national football team.

International Career Stats

Goals for Senior National Team

References

External links

1982 births
Living people
Kyrgyzstani footballers
Kyrgyzstan international footballers
FC Dordoi Bishkek players
Footballers at the 2010 Asian Games
Association football midfielders
Asian Games competitors for Kyrgyzstan